The 1954 Shoreditch and Finsbury by-election was held on 21 October 1954 after the death of the incumbent Labour MP, Ernest Thurtle.  It was retained by the Labour candidate, Victor Collins.

References

Shoreditch and Finsbury,1954
Shoreditch and Finsbury by-election
Shoreditch and Finsbury by-election
Shoreditch
Shoreditch and Finsbury,1954